Mill Race Bridge is a historic structure located northwest of Eldorado, Iowa, United States. Its name is derived from its location near a riverside mill. Horace E. Horton, a civil engineer from Minneapolis, had designed wagon bridges for Fayette County in the 1880s. When he joined the Chicago Bridge & Iron Company late in the decade, he took the county with him as a client. Chicago Bridge & Iron was responsible for providing the county's bridges in the 1890s. This bridge was completed about 1892, but its concrete abutments are not original. While it remains in place, but it has been replaced by a newer span. The Mill Race Bridge was listed on the National Register of Historic Places in 1998.

See also

List of bridges documented by the Historic American Engineering Record in Iowa

References

External links

Infrastructure completed in 1892
Bridges in Fayette County, Iowa
Historic American Engineering Record in Iowa
National Register of Historic Places in Fayette County, Iowa
Road bridges on the National Register of Historic Places in Iowa
Truss bridges in Iowa
Warren truss bridges in the United States